Wu Qiuhua (born 21 June 1959) is a Chinese fencer. She competed in the women's team foil event at the 1984 Summer Olympics.

References

1959 births
Living people
Chinese female fencers
Olympic fencers of China
Fencers at the 1984 Summer Olympics